The Alfa Romeo Indy V8 engine is a turbocharged, 2.65-liter, Indy car racing engine, designed and built by Alfa Romeo, for use in the CART PPG Indy Car World Series; between 1989 and 1991. The engine was used in March and Lola car chassis'.

When Alfa Romeo unveiled their (unrelated) 2.65-liter IndyCar engine, it was in the back of a March chassis; however, it was also seen testing at Fiorano Circuit in the unraced 637 chassis.

Applications
March 89CE-March 90CE
Lola T90/00
Lola T91/00

References

Engines by model
Gasoline engines by model
Alfa Romeo
IndyCar Series
Champ Car
V8 engines
Alfa Romeo in motorsport
Alfa Romeo engines